Gene Harris (1933–2000) was an American pianist.

Gene or Eugene Harris may also refer to:
Gene Harris (baseball) (born 1964), former Major League Baseball player

See also
Gene Harris of the Three Sounds, a 1972  album by American pianist Gene Harris
Jean Harris (disambiguation)